Lindsay Stoddart was the thirteenth Dean of Hobart, serving from 2006 to 2008.

Stoddart was educated at Fuller Theological Seminary and the University of Sheffield. He had ministered in three parishes, set up the Anglican Youthworks in Sydney and been the Archdeacon of Wollongong before his cathedral appointment.

References

Fuller Theological Seminary alumni
Alumni of the University of Sheffield
Archdeacons of Wollongong
Deans of Hobart
Living people
Year of birth missing (living people)
21st-century Australian Anglican priests